Dominika Lasota (born 26 November 2001 in Bydgoszcz, Poland) is a Polish climate justice activist who has been an active organizer in the Fridays for Future movement in Poland, at COP26 in Glasgow in November 2021 and in face-to-face talks with European leaders on climate justice and its relation to the 2022 Russian invasion of Ukraine. The New York Times described her as characterising a "new brand of activist" in linking climate activism with opposition to the Russian invasion. She is a founding member of the Consultative Council, created as the result of the October 2020 Polish protests.

Childhood and education
Lasota was born on 26 November 2001. She attended Stonyhurst College in England for two years around 2018–2019 and participated in youth camps in the United States.

Climate activism

School Strike for Climate
Lasota is an activist in the School Strike for Climate (aka Fridays for Future) movement and active in campaigning on European climate law and for a Just Transition, an economic transformation to a green economy that protects workers.

Climate activism in Poland
Within Poland, Lasota was described by Paulina Sobiesiak-Penszko of the Polish Institute of Public Affairs in 2022 as "the face of the Polish climate action movement", and by Deutsche Welle as "the main organizer of climate strikes in Poland".

Protests
On 15 June 2020, Lasota was one of the activists holding a happening in front of the Chancellery of the Prime Minister of Poland to pressure the Polish government on climate crisis issues in the 19 June 2020 European Council meeting. Lasota argued that since scientists' advice was listened to during the COVID-19 pandemic, the advice of scientists in the Intergovernmental Panel on Climate Change (IPCC) Assessment and Special reports should also be listened to.

Lasota criticised the failure of the Prime Minister's staff to intervene in an attack on a climate activist. The attack occurred during a meeting between politicians and the public in Bydgoszcz on 26 June, in relation to the 2020 Polish presidential election. Several "older people" attacked climate activist Malwina Chmara, "just 1.5–2 metres from the Prime Minister", according to Lasota. Lasota stated that "nothing was done to stop the attack". Lasota and Chmara said that they didn't understand the reason for the violent attacks, and they found it hurtful that neither the prime minister's nor president's office apologised for the failure to intervene.

In a protest in Bydgoszcz in September 2020, she argued that the climate crisis affected people unequally since poorer people were less able to protect their houses from hurricanes and floods. She stated that effects of the climate crisis felt in Poland included the April 2020 forest fires in Biebrza National Park and farmers' losses due to drought. Lasota stated that she and the other climate activists intended to "challenge the Polish prime minister to a fair transformation" in relation to global warming.

Media
In July 2022, together with atmospheric physicist  and climatologist , Lasota was interviewed on TVN24 about the increased occurrence of droughts in Poland.

COP26
At the November 2021 United Nations Climate Change Conference (COP26) in Glasgow, Lasota, together with other Fridays for Future activists including Vanessa Nakate and Nicole Becker, held a protest on 8 November, prior to a speech by former US president Barack Obama, arguing that he had failed to fulfill his promise to provide  billion in climate funding to developing countries. Later during COP26, Lasota argued that "the climate crisis has a gender. It's fueled by a lot of privileged white men from the global north, especially from the west. ... it's not a surprise that it is women who step up." Lasota, Nakate and Greta Thunberg met Nicola Sturgeon, First Minister of Scotland, during the conference. Glasgow newspaper The Herald described Lasota, Thunberg and Nakate as leaders in limiting global warming. Psychology lecturer Yvonne Skipper described Lasota and her colleagues' meeting with Sturgeon as having "a galvanising effect" of encouraging other young people to take action against the climate emergency.

2022 Russian invasion of Ukraine
In March 2022, during the 2022 Russian invasion of Ukraine, Lasota and three other Fridays for Future activists met with European Commission president Ursula von der Leyen. Lasota described von der Leyen as being "strongly committed" to the aim of shifting from fossil fuels to renewable energy. Von der Leyen described Lasota and her colleagues as "very bright young women, very knowledgeable". In May 2022, at the end of a talk by French president Emmanuel Macron, Lasota and Wiktoria Jędroszkowiak confronted Macron with questions arguing that the climate crisis should be stopped and that stopping the purchase of fossil fuels from Russia would help to stop the 2022 Russian invasion of Ukraine. Video of the interaction spread virally.

The New York Times (NYT) described Lasota and Jędroszkowiak as "leaders in a dynamic new wing of the antiwar movement" in the sense that they combined opposition to the Russian invasion with climate activism. NYT defined the women as constituting "a different brand of activist — young, mostly female and mostly from Eastern Europe — who believes that the Ukraine war is a brutal manifestation of the world's dependence on fossil fuels" and who "confront Europe's leaders face to face".

In late May 2022, Lasota, Jędroszkowiak and other activists held a protest in front of the European Commission Berlaymont building during a meeting of EU leaders discussing Russia-related sanctions. The activists interpreted the EU leaders' decision to embargo about 80 percent of Russian oil as "mixed success".

COP27
Lasota and Wiktoria Jędroszkowiak attended COP27 in November 2022. On 7 November, as one of the leaders of an activist group of Eastern Europeans, Lasota met von der Leyen again, arguing that no new investments in fossil fuels were justified, neither in response to the Russian invasion of Ukraine, nor to the crisis in energy costs, nor to the climate crisis.

On 8 November, Lasota briefly talked with Polish president Andrzej Duda on whether the government was sufficiently active in relation to the climate crisis. Lasota's talk with Duda was seen by Polish media as the most important event of COP27 on 8 November. Lasota stated to a TVN24 journalist that laws relating to the use of fossil fuels were passed easily in Poland while a law relating to wind turbines appeared to have been blocked, with the effect of delaying the development of clean energy in Poland. In an interview with Wysokie Obcasy, Lasota stated that Duda's response to her question was "a lie and a climate foul, since sticking to the illusory belief and promise that we can continue with coal in today's times is scandalous". Paulina Sobiesiak-Penszko of the Polish Institute of Public Affairs described Duda as an "old white m[a]n" who treated Lasota disrespectfully in their COP27 discussion.

On 15 November, together with Jędroszkowiak and Ukrainian activists Svitlana Romanko, Valeria Bondarieva and Viktoriya Ball, Lasota protested during a session held by Russians, whose 150-person delegation at COP27 included 33 fuel lobbyists. The activists called out to the Russian delegation that the Russians were war criminals who didn't have the right to be present at the conference and didn't deserve respect. Lasota asked, "How dare you sit here in peace? You're war criminals! You don't deserve any respect." Lasota called the Russians "despicable" and held up a banner "Fossil Fuels Kill" facing the Russian delegates. Lasota and the other activists were forced out by security personnel, and others, including members of the Polish delegation and German climate activists, also left the room.

Lasota and Jędroszkowiak described COP27 as being to a large extent a greenwashing operation. They said that the climate activist community had been divided about whether to attend, given the human rights situation in Egypt during the el-Sisi presidency and the expectations of greenwashing. Lasota and Jędroszkowiak decided to attend the meeting with the aim of promoting decisions that favour people rather than those that favour the fuel lobby. They described the actual situation during the meeting as authoritarian, with activists' contributions to the meeting tightly controlled, and the activists feeling in danger and not taken seriously. Lasota and Jędroszkowiak called for support for the Fossil Fuel Non-Proliferation Treaty Initiative.

Consultative Council
Lasota was chosen as one of the founding members of the Consultative Council created on 1 November 2020 in the context of the October 2020 Polish protests, as a contact with the School strike for climate movement.

References

Living people
2001 births
Polish environmentalists
Polish women environmentalists
Polish women activists
People from Bydgoszcz
Climate activists
Youth climate activists